Same Old Man is a 2008 album by John Hiatt. It was released 27 May 2008.

Track listing
 "Old Days"
 "Love You Again"
 "On With You"
 "Hurt My Baby"
 "What Love Can Do"
 "Ride My Pony"
 "Cherry Red"
 "Our Time"
 "Two Hearts"
 "Same Old Man"
 "Let’s Give This Love a Try"

Personnel
John Hiatt - Acoustic and electric guitar, vocals, six string bass, harmonium
Luther Dickinson - Acoustic and electric guitar, mandolin, National Resonator
Kenneth Blevins - Drums
Patrick O'Hearn - Bass
Lilly Hiatt - Vocals on ("Love You Again" written by Roger Coots) and "What Love Can Do"
not all songs were written by John Hiatt

Single

Old Days (2008) 
Old Days  (4:02)
Love You Again (4:13)
Cherry Red (4:09)

References

2008 albums
John Hiatt albums
New West Records albums